Tricholoma arvernense is a mushroom of the agaric genus Tricholoma. First described as a variety of Tricholoma sejunctum by French mycologist Marcel Bon in 1975, he promoted it to species status a year later.

See also
List of North American Tricholoma
List of Tricholoma species

References

arvernense
Fungi described in 1975
Fungi of Europe
Fungi of North America